Symplocos carmencitae is a species of plant in the family Symplocaceae. It is endemic to Ecuador.  Its natural habitat is subtropical or tropical moist montane forest.

References

Endemic flora of Ecuador
carmencitae
Endangered plants
Taxonomy articles created by Polbot